This Land is the third studio album by American blues rock musician Gary Clark Jr., and was released on February 22, 2019, by Warner Bros. Records. It won the Grammy Award for Best Contemporary Blues Album in 2020, while the title track won Best Rock Song and Best Rock Performance.

Background and production
Apart from "When I'm Gone," which was recorded on a Fender Stratocaster, Clark Jr. used a Gibson SG electric guitar to record This Land.

Promotion
The album was announced with a video for the lead single "This Land" directed by Austin, Texas-based filmmaker Savanah Leaf. The song and video highlight racism in American society, with Leaf recreating aspects of Clark's childhood as described by the musician to the director, and Clark's response to the policies of President Donald Trump since he was elected in 2016. The track was inspired by "This Land Is Your Land" by Woody Guthrie, with Clark commenting in an interview with American Songwriter: "It’s one of the first songs we learn, and we sing it together ... It's like the Pledge of Allegiance ... And when you're kids, everybody's together. You don't see differences until you get older, and older people influence you to think about other people a certain way. I just want to get back to singing that song like we were kids again, you know?" Writer Dan Solomon, in Texas Monthly, described "This Land" as "perhaps the first truly great song of Clark's career, a defiant, statement-piece anthem that fits alongside pieces like Childish Gambino's "This is America" and Beyoncé's "Formation" in its vocal addressing of racism in America."

Clark started the album's promotional tour in March 2019.

Commercial performance
This Land debuted at number six on the US Billboard 200 with 54,000 album-equivalent units, of which 51,000 were pure album sales. It is his third US top 10 album.

Track listing
All tracks written by Gary Clark Jr.; track 1 co-written by Woody Guthrie.

Personnel
 Gary Clark Jr. – vocals , guitar , bass , keyboards , percussion 

Additional musicians
 Doyle Bramhall II – lute 
 Mike Elizondo – bass , synth bass 
 Alex Peterson – bass 
 Brannen Temple – drums 
 J.J. Johnson – drums 
 Jon Deas – keyboards , Hammond organ 
 Sheila E. – percussion 
 Keyon Harrold – horn 
 Gabe Burch – backing vocals 
 Scooter Weinbtraub – backing vocals 
 Jacob Sciba – backing vocals 
 Gaston Jouany – backing vocals 
 Joseph Holguin – backing vocals 
 Branko Presley – backing vocals 
 Katelyn O'Neal – backing vocals 
 Lazaro Zarate – backing vocals 
 Mikayla Mundy – backing vocals 
 Pam Adams – backing vocals 

Technical
 Gabe Burch – engineering
 Gary Clark Jr. – engineering, production, programming
 Jacob Sciba – production, mixing, engineering
 Joseph Angel – production 
 Lab Ox - production
 Scooter Weintraub – production
 Mike Elizondo – production 
 Howie Weinberg – mastering
 Joseph Holguin – engineering 
 Adam Hawkins – engineering

Charts

Weekly charts

Year-end charts

References

2019 albums
Gary Clark Jr. albums
Warner Records albums